Sedan is an unincorporated community in Scioto County, in the U.S. state of Ohio.

History
A post office called Sedan was established in 1871, and remained in operation until 1918. Besides the post office, Sedan had at least two early churches.

References

Unincorporated communities in Scioto County, Ohio
Unincorporated communities in Ohio